The Ministry of Public Health (MOPH;) is a Thai governmental body responsible for the oversight of public health in Thailand. It is commonly referred to in Thailand by its abbreviation so tho.

History
In Thailand before 1888 there were no permanent, public hospitals to provide care to sick people. Temporary hospitals were set up to care for patients during epidemics, then disbanded when the epidemic subsided. Under King Chulalongkorn (Rama V) a hospital was constructed and completed in 1888 and named "Siriraj Hospital" in commemoration of the king's young son, Prince Siriraj Kakudhabhand, who had died of dysentery. King Vajiravudh, King Chulalongkorn's successor, established Department of Health on 27 November 1918.

During the reign of King Rama VIII, the Ministry of Public Health was established on 10 March 1942 as a result of the enactment of the Ministries and Departments Reorganization Act (Amendment No. 3) of B.E. 2485. Later in 1966, the date 27 November was chosen as the commemoration day of the Ministry of Public Health's foundation.

Budget
The MOPH was allocated 135,389 million baht in the FY2019 budget.

Departments

Organisation
 Office of the Minister
 Office of the Permanent Secretary
 Department of Mental Health
 Department of Disease Control
 Department of Health
 Department of Medical Services
 Department of Medical Sciences
 Department of Health Service Support (HSS)
 Department of Thai Tradition and Alternative Medicine
 Food and Drug Administration

State enterprise
 Government Pharmaceutical Organization

Public organisations
 Ban Phaeo Hospital (Public Organisation)
 Healthcare Accreditation Institute (Public Organisation)
 National Vaccine Institute (Public Organization)
 Health Systems Research Institute
 National Health Security Office (NHSO): Manages Thailand's Universal Health Coverage (UHC) system.
 National Institute for Emergency Medicine

See also 
 Government Pharmaceutical Organization (Thailand)
 Health in Thailand
 Hospitals in Thailand
 Royal Thai Army Medical Department
 Sukha
 Sukhaphiban
 Health Intervention and Technology Assessment Program

References

External links
Thai Health Promotion Foundation
Thailand Medical Hub

 
Public Health
Health in Thailand
Thailand
Ministries established in 1918
1918 establishments in Siam